The Devi Gita is an ancient Hindu philosophical text from Devi-Bhagavata Purana, a major text of the Shakta devotees, in the form of dialogue between Mahadevi and king Himavan. It is also one of the sixty-four Gitas commonly referred to in Hindu scriptures.

Nomenclature 
Gita means "song", Devi is the sanskrit word for "Goddess";  the masculine form is deva. Accordingly Devi Gita literally means "the song of the Goddess."'

Date 
C Mackenzie Brown states that given the specific philosophical ideas and literary works with which the Devi Gita is familiar, it is difficult to place the text earlier than the thirteenth century of the Common Era, and possibly as late as the sixteenth century.

Structure 
The Devi Gita, the last ten chapters of the seventh Canto of the Devi Bhagavata Purana, consists 507 verses. It presents a magnificent vision of a universe created, pervaded and protected by an all-powerful, all-knowing and all-compassionate Divine Feminine.

Content 
The Devi Gita frequently explains Shakta ideas by quoting from the Bhagavad Gita.

Narrative 
The Devi Gita focuses on the Goddess’s answers to Himalaya’s queries. Tarakasura, the king of demons, conquered the three worlds after receiving a boon from Lord Brahma. While the gods, who have lost their divine kingdoms to the demon Taraka, take refuge in the goddess to regain their worldly fortunes, Himalaya, the epitome of supreme devotion, seeks spiritual realization for himself. He inquires of the Goddess about her true nature and relation to the material world as well as the means of union with the Supreme Goddess, the ultimate goal of human existence. As the Universal Mother is anxious to satisfy the desires of all her children, she fulfills the desires of the King Himalaya. She first appears to the gods and the Himalayas in a blinding light representing the Absolute or Brahman, whose nature is infinite existence, pure consciousness and eternal bliss. Then, the Goddess quickly emerges from the orb of light in her non-transcendental form as Bhuvaneshwari, the beautiful and gracious, four-armed, Mother of the Universe. Later in the Devi Gita, while describing her essential oneness with the universe, the goddess manifests her most terrifying, masculine form, Virat.

Chapters

Chapter 1:The Appearance of the Great Goddess before the Mountain King Himalaya and the Gods 

The first chapter of the Devi Gita provides the mythological background for the spiritual instructions of the devotees of the Great Goddess. The Devi Gita begins with Vyasa's disciple King Janamejaya questioning the manifestation of this supreme energy. Oppressed deities She is praised in hymns. This is the first of two important hymns in the Devi Gita that depict the Goddess as one power. Behind all the goddesses, the energy of all, and identifies her with Brahman. The first part of the hymn is based on the "Devi Stuti" contained in the Devi Upanishad. After the hymn, the gods called for help against the Taraka. In view of the exemplary and steadfast devotion of the king Himalaya, the Devi Bhuvaneshwari assures them of help by promising to send the energy known as Gauri as a special act of grace to the king Himalaya. Unlike the gods, Himalaya is primarily motivated by a desire for spiritual realization, and so he makes a special request of his own. He prays to the Devi to explain the true nature of the Goddess and to explain the various paths of yoga discipline, devotion and knowledge.

Chapter 2: The Devi as the Supreme Cause of Creation 

Second chapter briefly outlines the first cosmological process using two overlapping models of creation, one an evolutionary unfolding of primordial elements based on the classical Samkhya school, and the other a reflective model emphasizing the transcendence and immutability of supreme reality, a model particularly favored by Advaita. According to the evolutionary model presented in the text, as Mackenzie Brown points out, the Goddess brings forth from within herself the creative, projective power known as Maya, the efficient and material cause of the universe.

Chapter 3: The Devi Reveals Her Cosmic Body (Virat Rupa) 

Chapter 3 describes how the Goddess enters into her creation and thereby becomes unattached to samsara. At the same time, she expresses her identity with all cosmic and mundane manifestations in a grand cosmic vision of the universe.

Chapter 4: Instruction in the Yoga of Knowledge 
In chapter 4, the Devi continues her discussion interrupted by her cosmic manifestation as the Virat of the genesis of individual souls through the power of ignorance and its karmic entanglements.

Chapter 5: Instruction in the Serpentine Yoga

Chapter 6: The Goal of the Yogas: Knowledge of Brahman

Chapter 7: Instruction in the Yoga of Devotion

Chapter 8: Further Instruction in the Yoga of Devotion: The Sacred Sites, Rites, and Festivals of the Devi

Chapter 9: Vedic and Internal Forms of Goddess Worship

Chapter 10: The Tantric Form of Goddess Worship and the Disappearance of Mahadevi

Philosophy 
The Goddess is described by the text as a "universal, cosmic energy" resident within each individual, weaving in the terminology of Samkhya school of Hindu philosophy. It is full of Advaita Vedanta ideas, emphasizing its ambiguity, misrepresenting all dualities, and treating the interconnected oneness of the soul of all beings with Brahman as liberating knowledge. The Bhakti concept of the Devi Gita portion of this Purana is influenced by the Bhagavad Gita, and shares similarities with the Vaishnava concepts of devotion to Krishna found in the Bhagavata Purana. A special type of devotion called para bhakti is mentioned here as the highest way of realizing the supreme goddess.

SDB 07.37.11:12 original Sanskrit:

SDB 07.37.13:14 original Sanskrit:

Translations 
There are several separate translations of Devi Gita.

 Devi Gita - The Song of The Goddess translated by C. Mackenzie Brown
 Devi Gita translated by swami Satyananda Saraswati
 Sri Devi Gita translated by Ramamurthy Natarajan
 Sri Devi Gitai (Tamil Edition) by Ramamurthy Natarajan
 Le chant de la déesse: le Devi-Gita & autres textes de la tradition sakta by Pierre Bonnasse
 El Devî Gîtâ. L´ univers de la gran deessa by Samadhi Marga
 Деви гита. Песнь Великой Богини (Devi Gita: Song of the Great Goddess)

See also 

 Devi Mahatmya
 Devi-Bhagavata Purana
 Bhagavad Gita
 Ishvara Gita
 Uddhava Gita
 Vedas
 Prasthanatrayi
 Vyadha Gita

References

Works cited

 
 
 
 

Shaktism
Hindu philosophy
Sanskrit texts
Religious texts
Puranas